Lev Vasilyevich Uspensky (8 February 1900 – 18 December 1978) was a Russian writer and philologist, known for his popular science books in linguistics.

Works

Prose
«Запах лимона» (1928, with L.L. Rubinov, as Lev Rubus) 
«Пулковский меридиан» (1939, with G.N. Karayev)
«60-я параллель» (1955, with G.N. Karayev)

Science fiction
Плавание «Зэты». (1946) 
Шальмугровое яблоко. (1972)
Эн-два-о плюс икс дважды. (1971)

Popular science 
«Слово о словах» (1954), popular linguistics
«Ты и твоё имя» (1960), popular linguistics 
«Имя дома твоего» (1967), popular linguistics 
«Загадки топонимики» (1969), popular linguistics 
«По закону буквы», popular linguistics, history of Russian alphabet
Почему не иначе? Этимологический словарь школьника
За языком до Киева, popular linguistics
По дорогам и тропам языка, popular linguistics
За семью печатями, popular archaeology
Записки старого петербуржца, popular history of St.Petersburg
Мифы Древней Греции, popular Greek mythology
Золотое руно; Двенадцать подвигов Геракла, popular Greek mythology

References

1900 births
1978 deaths
Russian writers
Russian philologists
Burials at Bogoslovskoe Cemetery
20th-century philologists